Jing-Jing Lee (born 1985) is a Singaporean author who writes in the English language; her best-known work is the novel How We Disappeared (2019).

Early life 
Lee was born in Singapore in 1985 and grew up speaking Mandarin. She was not read to as a child, only discovering books at school. She attended The Chinese High School and then went to the National University of Singapore, where she studied social science and business before dropping out. She later completed a MSt in Creative Writing at Oxford University.

Career

Lee published a book of short stories, If I Could Tell You, in 2013, and a poetry collection And Other Rivers  in 2015.

Her debut novel, How We Disappeared, was published in 2019 and was longlisted for the Women's Prize for Fiction; it was included in the Big Jubilee Read, a list of 70 novels by Commonwealth authors created to mark Queen Elizabeth II's Platinum Jubilee.

Selected publications

Short story collections
If I Could Tell You (2013)

Novels
How We Disappeared (2019)

Poetry
And Other Rivers (2015)

Personal life
Lee lives in Amsterdam with her husband Marco and their son.

References

External links
 

1985 births
Living people
Singaporean people of Chinese descent
Singaporean women short story writers
21st-century Singaporean women writers
Singaporean novelists
National University of Singapore alumni
Hwa Chong Institution alumni